The Vermont Republic gubernatorial election of 1789 took place in September. Though incumbent Governor Thomas Chittenden won a plurality of the popular vote over his main competitor, Vermont Supreme Court Chief Justice Moses Robinson, the Vermont Constitution required that the legislature choose if no candidate won a majority.

The Vermont General Assembly met in Westminster on October 8 to count the votes of the freemen for governor of the Republic of Vermont, lieutenant governor, treasurer, and members of the governor's council. Joseph Marsh was easily re-elected as lieutenant governor, and Samuel Mattocks was chosen for another term as treasurer.

For the first time since the founding of the Vermont Republic in 1778, Chittenden found himself in political difficulty. Shortly before the election, he had granted Ira Allen title to the town of Woodbridge (now Highgate) but had neglected to first obtain the approval of the governor's council. Chittenden was accused of malfeasance for supposedly favoring a clique led by the Allen family with respect to land grants.

As a result of the controversy, On October 9, the legislature chose Robinson, the first time Chittenden had not been elected governor. Robinson served a one-year term, but the controversy over the Woodbridge land grant abated, and Chittenden was returned to office in 1790.

Results

References

Vermont gubernatorial elections
1789 in Vermont
1789 elections in North America